René Osthold (born 21 June 1965) is a German sports shooter. He competed in the men's 25 metre rapid fire pistol event at the 1992 Summer Olympics.

References

External links
 

1965 births
Living people
German male sport shooters
Olympic shooters of Germany
Shooters at the 1992 Summer Olympics
People from Butzbach
Sportspeople from Darmstadt (region)